is the fourth single of the Morning Musume subgroup Minimoni. It was released on January 30, 2002, and sold 325,440 copies, reaching number two on the Oricon Charts.

Track listing 
All songs written and composed by Tsunku.

Members at the time of single

External links 
 Minimoni Hinamatsuri!/Mini Strawberry Pie entry on the Hello! Project official website

Zetima Records singles
Minimoni songs
2002 singles
Songs written by Tsunku
Song recordings produced by Tsunku
Japanese-language songs